Houston Tomorrow is an independent nonprofit organization that works to improve the quality of life for all people in the Houston region through research, education, and discussion. 

Houston Tomorrow was formerly known as the Gulf Coast Institute, a nonprofit organization founded in 1998 to research urban issues in the Houston, Texas Gulf Coast Region. From the beginning, the organization aimed to improve quality of life in the Houston area through public transportation, improving environmental conditions, and creating sustainable development.

Houston Tomorrow conducts studies on quality of life issues in Houston, sponsors regular meetings, publishes a dynamic website and newsletter, and offers opportunities for input and dialogue relevant to Houston's growth.

It also hosts many events, including the Texas Triangle conference, with the first one held in September 24–25, 2009 in Houston.

External links
 HoustonTomorrow.org

References

Non-profit organizations based in Texas
Organizations based in Houston